Eduard Pană (born 28 May 1944 in Brăneşti) is a retired Romanian ice hockey player. For some years, he was the Secretary-General of the Romanian Ice Hockey Federation.

Pană was one of the best players in Europe during the 1970s. He participated in three Winter Olympics. He was inducted into the International Ice Hockey Federation Hall of Fame in 1998.

References

External links
 IIHF Hockey Hall of Fame bio

1944 births
Living people
Ice hockey players at the 1964 Winter Olympics
Ice hockey players at the 1968 Winter Olympics
Ice hockey players at the 1976 Winter Olympics
IIHF Hall of Fame inductees
Olympic ice hockey players of Romania
People from Ilfov County
Romanian ice hockey right wingers